Blue Country Heart is a Jorma Kaukonen studio album released in June, 2002.  It was his first album on a major label since 1980's Barbeque King. Kaukonen did not write any new compositions for the album, and instead played mostly country-blues cover songs. The album features performances by  Sam Bush, Jerry Douglas, Byron House and Bela Fleck, and was nominated for a Grammy award in 2003 for "Best Traditional Folk Album."

Track listing
"Blue Railroad Train" (Lionel Alton Delmore, Rabon Delmore) – 3:44
"Just Because" (Joe Shelton, Sydney Robin, Bob Shelton) – 4:16
"Blues Stay Away from Me" (Lionel Alton Delmore, Rabon Delmore, Henry Glover, Wayne Raney) – 3:28
"Red River Blues" (Jimmie Davis) – 3:25
"Bread Line Blues" (Bernard Slim Smith) – 4:38
"Waiting for a Train" (Jimmie Rodgers) – 3:26
"Those Gambler's Blues" (Jimmie Rodgers) – 3:07
"Tom Cat Blues" (Jelly Roll Morton) – 3:05
"Big River Blues" (Lionel Alton Delmore) – 3:01
"Prohibition Blues" (Clayton McMichen) – 4:13
"I'm Free from the Chain Gang Now" (Lou Herscher, Saul Klein) – 3:28
"You and My Old Guitar" (Jimmie Rodgers, Elsie McWilliams) – 2:45
"What are They Doing in Heaven Today?" (Traditional) – 3:20

Personnel
Jorma Kaukonen - guitar, vocals
Sam Bush – mandolin, fiddle, background vocals
Jerry Douglas – dobro, weissenborn
Byron House – bass, background vocals
Béla Fleck – banjo on "Just Because" and "Bread Line Blues"

Production
Roger Moutenot – producer, engineer, mixing
Yves Beauvis – producer, A&R
Tracy Martinson – engineer, digital recording
John Hurlbut, K. C. Groves, Rob Clark – assistant engineers
Ted Jensen – mastering
Jorma Kaukonen – liner notes
David Bett – art direction
Danny Clinch, Glen Rose, Gil Gilbert – photography

Charts

References

Jorma Kaukonen albums
2002 albums
Albums produced by Roger Moutenot
Columbia Records albums